Auritra Ghosh is an Indian actress and dancer. She is known for Indian films like Love Breakups Zindagi, M Cream and Dharam Sankat Mein. In recent times, she has garnered recognition for her work in various web series like the award-winning digital sci-fi thriller A.I.SHA My Virtual Girlfriend and Y-Films production Ladies' Room.

Ghosh was the face behind the Google Search: Reunion ad campaign. She received widespread, individual appreciation for her nuanced role in the ad-film.

Career 
Auritra started her career in the performing arts at the age of 16. Brought up in Delhi, her Bengali lineage along with her passion for creativity, provided for a great base to develop her skills in performing arts.

In 2001, she joined The Danceworx - Performing Arts Academy to further complement her earlier training in Kathak, where she trained in jazz, ballet, modern and contemporary dance. By 2002, she was a full-time instructor and choreographer with the academy picking up training along the way from renowned dance teachers across the world and even represented India at the Fontys Academy's International Dance Festival held in Tilburg, Netherlands in 2007.

She has performed in many theatre productions, including an adaptation of the award-winning play August: Osage County directed by Lillete Dubey. In 2017, she choreographed and performed in a Motley Production an adaptation of the renowned The Threepenny Opera as a part of Aadyam - a theatre initiative by Aditya Birla Group. Currently, she's part of the exciting cast of 'STAND UP: a serious play about comedy' - an Akvarious Theatre Production.

Auritra has also acted in many short films like the MTV Films' production Shaadi Vaadi And All That, Yesterday starring Kunaal Roy Kapur and Happy Anniversary by Pramod Films.

She started a venture called 'Pause and Effect' to curate performing arts and wellness events across the country.

Filmography

Films

Television & Web

References

External links 
 
 Auritra Ghosh on Facebook
 Google Search: Reunion on YouTube

Indian film actresses
Living people
People from Jamshedpur
Actresses from Jharkhand
Year of birth missing (living people)